Jan Bjur (born 4 August 1965) is a Danish former professional footballer who played as a midfielder for Vanløse IF, Brønshøj BK and Akademisk Boldklub (AB), winning the 1999 Danish Cup with AB. Jan Bjur played 148 games and scored 20 goals for AB in the Danish Superliga championship from 1996 to 2001.

He is the older brother of Danish international midfielder Ole Bjur, and the uncle of Brøndby IF player Peter Bjur. He has one daughter from a former marriage, Frederikke Bjur Susanka, now a law student.

References

External links

Living people
1965 births
Footballers from Copenhagen
Association football midfielders
Danish men's footballers
Akademisk Boldklub players
Brønshøj Boldklub players